The Statute Law (Repeals) Act 1977 (c 18) is an Act of the Parliament of the United Kingdom.

This Act was partly in force in Great Britain at the end of 2010.

It implemented recommendations contained in the eighth report on statute law revision, by the Law Commission and the Scottish Law Commission.

Section 1
Section 1(1) was repealed by Group 2 of Part IX of Schedule 1 to the Statute Law (Repeals) Act 1998.

Section 3
This section was repealed by section 1(1) of, and Part IV of Schedule 1 to, the Statute Law (Repeals) Act 1995.

Section 4
Section 4(2) was repealed by Group 2 of Part IX of Schedule 1 to the Statute Law (Repeals) Act 1998.

In section 4(3), the words from "or the Isle of Man" to the end were repealed by Group 2 of Part IX of Schedule 1 to the Statute Law (Repeals) Act 1998.

Orders under this section

The power conferred by section 4(3) was exercised by the Statute Law Repeals (Isle of Man) Order 1984 (SI 1984/1692).

The Orders in Council made under section 4(3) have lapsed because of the repeal made to that section by the Statute Law (Repeals) Act 1998.

Schedule 1
This Schedule was repealed by Group 2 of Part IX of Schedule 1 to the Statute Law (Repeals) Act 1998.

Schedule 2
The entry relating to the Army Reserve Act 1962 was repealed by section 157(1)(b) of, and Part II of Schedule 10 to, the Reserve Forces Act 1980.

The entries relating to the Highways Act 1959 and the Criminal Justice (Scotland) Act 1963 were repealed by Group 2 of Part IX of Schedule 1 to the Statute Law (Repeals) Act 1998.

Schedule 3
This Schedule authorised the citation by short titles of eight Acts passed between 1808 and 1868. This Schedule was repealed by section 1(1) of, and Part IV of Schedule 1 to, the Statute Law (Repeals) Act 1995.

See also
Statute Law (Repeals) Act

References
Halsbury's Statutes. Fourth Edition. 2008 Reissue. Volume 41. Page 794.
Peter Allsop (General editor). Current Law Statutes Annotated 1977. Sweet & Maxwell, Stevens & sons. London. W Green & son. Edinburgh. 1977.
The Public General Acts and General Synod Measures 1977. HMSO. London. 1978. Part I. Pages 241 to 278.
HL Deb vol 379, cols 629 and 1036 to 1039, vol 382, col 695, HC Deb vol 932, col 1746.

External links

United Kingdom Acts of Parliament 1977
June 1977 events in the United Kingdom